Metarctia transvaalica is a moth of the subfamily Arctiinae. It was described by Sergius G. Kiriakoff in 1973. It is found in South Africa.

References

 

Endemic moths of South Africa
Metarctia
Moths described in 1973